is a 1992 Japanese drama film directed by Kōji Wakamatsu. It was released on October 17, 1992.

Cast
Jennifer Galin as Loren
Rie Miyazawa as Rie
Takeshi Kitano as Okuyama
Yuya Uchida as Kishin

Reception
On Midnight Eye, Jasper Sharp said the film "is ponderously paced and decidedly unexciting, and its erotic content pretty sparse."

References

External links

1992 drama films
1992 films
Films directed by Kōji Wakamatsu
Films set in Paris
Japanese drama films
1990s Japanese films